Brian Cornelius Schottenheimer (born October 16, 1973) is an American football coach who is the offensive coordinator for the Dallas Cowboys of the National Football League (NFL). He previously served as the offensive coordinator for the Seattle Seahawks, New York Jets, St. Louis Rams and the University of Georgia and also served as an assistant  coach for the Washington Redskins, San Diego Chargers,  Indianapolis Colts, and Jacksonville Jaguars.

Early years 
Schottenheimer was born in Denver, Colorado.  He prepped at Blue Valley High School in Overland Park, Kansas, where he quarterbacked his team to the Kansas Class 5A state football championship in 1991, while earning first-team all-state and honorable mention high school All-American honors.  He threw for 2,586 yards and 26 touchdowns in his career. His success at Blue Valley High School led to a scholarship for the University of Kansas.

Playing career

College
Schottenheimer first attended the University of Kansas in Lawrence, Kansas, where he was a member of the Kansas Jayhawks football team for a single season in 1992 serving as a backup to starting quarterback Chip Hilleary.  He transferred to the University of Florida in Gainesville, Florida, sat out a year as required by NCAA transfer rules, and then played for coach Steve Spurrier's Florida Gators football team from 1994 to 1996.  Schottenheimer served as backup to starting quarterback Danny Wuerffel, and was a member of the Gators' 1996 Bowl Alliance national championship team.  During his college playing career, he completed twenty-five of thirty-eight passes (65.8%) for 290 yards and two touchdowns, and also ran for a touchdown.

Schottenheimer graduated from Florida with a bachelor's degree in exercise and sports science in 1997.

Coaching career

Early career
Schottenheimer was an assistant coach from 1997 to 2005 with the St. Louis Rams, Kansas City Chiefs, Syracuse Orange, and USC Trojans, including as quarterback coach for the Washington Redskins and San Diego Chargers. He was an assistant under his father, Marty Schottenheimer, in three of those coaching positions: Kansas City Chiefs, Washington Redskins, and San Diego Chargers.

New York Jets
In 2006, he became offensive coordinator for the New York Jets and, in early 2007, Schottenheimer's name was floated around as being a possible replacement for the departed Nick Saban as the Miami Dolphins head coach. He later removed his name from consideration for the Dolphins head coaching position, preferring to stay with the New York Jets.

After the 2008 NFL season, when Jets coach Eric Mangini was fired, Schottenheimer was one of the first candidates interviewed for the open head coaching position. However, he eventually lost out to Baltimore Ravens defensive coordinator Rex Ryan. On January 13, 2010, Schottenheimer announced that he was staying with the Jets as Offensive Coordinator and would not interview for the head coaching vacancy in Buffalo.

St. Louis Rams
On January 10, 2012, Schottenheimer announced he would not return to the Jets for the 2012 season. On January 21, 2012, Schottenheimer became the offensive coordinator of the St. Louis Rams.

Georgia
On January 7, 2015, it was announced that Schottenheimer would take over as offensive coordinator and quarterbacks coach for the Georgia Bulldogs football team of the University of Georgia, under head coach Mark Richt.  Following Richt's firing at the end of the 2015 season, Schottenheimer announced on December 14 to his position players that he would not return as a Georgia Bulldogs assistant coach in 2016.

Indianapolis Colts
On January 18, 2016, the Indianapolis Colts announced that they had hired Schottenheimer as their quarterbacks coach.

Seattle Seahawks
On January 15, 2018, the Seattle Seahawks announced that they had hired Schottenheimer as their offensive coordinator. The Seahawks went on to have the leagues top rushing offense for the 2018 season and quarterback Russell Wilson had a career high 110.9 passer rating.

On January 12, 2021, Schottenheimer was fired by the Seahawks following the Seahawks' Wild Card loss to the Los Angeles Rams due to "philosophical differences". Despite a torrid start to the 2020 season which saw career highs for quarterback Russell Wilson in touchdowns and completion percentage, Seattle's offense struggled considerably during the final weeks, with Schottenheimer taking the brunt of the scrutiny due to lack of creativity in the offense and adjustments to the scheme. Regardless, the Seahawks set their franchise record for points scored in a season with 459.

Jacksonville Jaguars
On February 1, 2021, Schottenheimer was hired by the Jacksonville Jaguars as their passing game coordinator under head coach Urban Meyer.

On February 8, 2022, upon the Jaguars hiring of Doug Pederson as the head coach, Schottenheimer was not retained on the coaching staff.

Dallas Cowboys 
On March 24, 2022, Schottenheimer was hired by the Dallas Cowboys as a consultant. He was promoted to offensive coordinator on February 4, 2023.

Personal life
Schottenheimer is the son of the late Marty Schottenheimer, who had been the head coach of the Cleveland Browns, Washington Redskins, San Diego Chargers, and Kansas City Chiefs and his uncle, Kurt Schottenheimer, was also the defensive backs coach and defensive coordinator for the Chiefs. In addition to coaching, Schottenheimer is a frequent contributor to The 33rd Team, which describes itself as a "football Think Tank."

References

1973 births
Living people
American football quarterbacks
Dallas Cowboys coaches
Florida Gators football players
Georgia Bulldogs football coaches
Indianapolis Colts coaches
Jacksonville Jaguars coaches
Kansas City Chiefs coaches
Kansas Jayhawks football players
National Football League offensive coordinators
New York Jets coaches
Players of American football from Denver
San Diego Chargers coaches
Seattle Seahawks coaches
Sportspeople from Denver
St. Louis Rams coaches
USC Trojans football coaches
Washington Redskins coaches